The 1963 Brisbane Rugby League season was the 55th season of the Brisbane Rugby League premiership. Eight teams from across Brisbane competed for the premiership, which culminated in Northern Suburbs defeating Southern Suburbs 18-8 to claim their fifth consecutive premiership.

Ladder

Finals 

Source:

References 

1963 in rugby league
1963 in Australian rugby league
Rugby league in Brisbane